Shane Robinson may refer to:
 Charles Shane Robinson (born 1964), American referee
 Shane Robinson (footballer) (born 1980), Irish football midfielder
 Shane Robinson (politician) (born 1976), American politician in Maryland
 Shane Robinson (baseball) (born 1984), American baseball center fielder
 Shane Robinson (cricketer) (born 1967), New Zealand cricketer